Trash may refer to:

Garbage
 Garbage, unwanted or undesired waste material
 Litter, material discarded in inappropriate places
 Municipal solid waste, unwanted or undesired waste material generated in a municipal environment

Arts, entertainment, and media

Art
Trash art, artworks created from discarded objects

Films, TV, videogames
"Trash", a video game term
 Trash (1970 film), an American film
 Trash (2011 film), a Canadian drama film
 Trash (2014 film), a British film
 Trash (video game), a multiplayer real-time strategy
 Trash TV, a form of television programming considered to be tasteless and unprofessional
 Trash Video, a Finnish film production company 
 Z movie, a low-budget exploitation movie category

Literature
 Trash (comics), a Marvel Comics organisation
 Trash (manga), a manga created by Sanami Matoh
 Trash (novel), a 2010 novel by Andy Mulligan
 Trash: Short Stories, a 1988 publication by Dorothy Allison

Music

Bands
 Trash (band), a British band also known as White Trash

Albums
 Trash (The Stalin album), the first full-length album by Japanese hardcore punk group The Stalin
 Trash (Alice Cooper album), a 1989 album by singer Alice Cooper

Songs
 "Trash" (New York Dolls song), a 1973 song by the New York Dolls
 "Trash" (Roxy Music song), a 1979 song by Roxy Music from Manifesto
 "Trash" (Suede song), the leading single of Suede's Coming Up album
 "Trash", a song by Berlin from Count Three & Pray
 "Trash", a song by Robin Gibb fromSesame Street Fever
 "Trash", a song by Korn from Issues
 "Trash", a song by Morrissey from Live in Dallas
 "Trash", a song by The Doll, 1977
 "Trash", a song by The Whip

Brands and enterprises
 Trash (nightclub), a popular London indie–electroelectro nightclub run by Erol Alkan from 1997 until 2007
 Trash and Vaudeville, clothing vendors

Other uses
 Trash (computing), a way in which operating systems dispose of unwanted files. Called a "Recycle Bin" on Microsoft Windows
 Junk food
 Trash Doves, viral Facebook meme

See also
 Recycle bin
 Trash bag
 Trash can
 Trash culture
Trash talk
 White trash (disambiguation)